The Municipality of Velike Lašče is a municipality in Slovenia. The seat of the municipality is the town of Velike Lašče. It is part of the traditional region of Lower Carniola and is now included in the Central Slovenia Statistical Region.

The area is the birthplace of a number of notable Slovene writers: Primož Trubar, Josip Stritar, Fran Levstik, and Jože Javoršek.

Settlements
In addition to the municipal seat of Velike Lašče, the municipality also includes the following settlements:

Adamovo
Bane
Bavdek
Borovec pri Karlovici
Boštetje
Brankovo
Brlog
Bukovec
Centa
Četež pri Turjaku
Dednik
Dolenje Kališče
Dolnje Retje
Dolščaki
Dvorska Vas
Gorenje Kališče
Gornje Retje
Gradež
Gradišče
Grm
Hlebče
Hrustovo
Jakičevo
Javorje
Kaplanovo
Karlovica
Knej
Kot pri Veliki Slevici
Krkovo pri Karlovici
Krvava Peč
Kukmaka
Laporje
Laze
Logarji
Lužarji
Mački
Mala Slevica
Male Lašče
Mali Ločnik
Mali Osolnik
Marinčki
Medvedjek
Mohorje
Naredi
Opalkovo
Osredek
Pečki
Plosovo
Podhojni Hrib
Podkogelj
Podkraj
Podlog
Podsmreka pri Velikih Laščah
Podstrmec
Podulaka
Podžaga
Polzelo
Poznikovo
Prazniki
Prhajevo
Prilesje
Purkače
Pušče
Rašica
Rob
Rupe
Ščurki
Sekirišče
Selo pri Robu
Škamevec
Škrlovica
Sloka Gora
Srnjak
Srobotnik pri Velikih Laščah
Stope
Strletje
Strmec
Tomažini
Turjak
Ulaka
Uzmani
Velika Slevica
Veliki Ločnik
Veliki Osolnik
Vrh
Žaga 
Zgonče

References

External links

Municipality of Velike Lašče on Geopedia
Municipality of Velike Lašče website

 
Velike Lasce
1998 establishments in Slovenia